Yuri Sapega (1 January 1965   – 29 September 2005) was a Belarusian professional volleyball player and coach. He was a member of the USSR National Team since 1986 and won a silver medal at the 1988 Summer Olympics, competing for the USSR. He was 194 cm tall and played both as passer-hitter and middle hitter. Sapega was born in Grodno

He was nicknamed "the poet" for his elegant style. He played in Italy for Padova in the 1990s. After ending his career as player, he worked as second coach for Russian volleyball national team, and later had a manager position in the Russian Volleyball Championship.

He died in Moscow in 2005 after a heart attack.

Clubs

References

1965 births
2005 deaths
Belarusian men's volleyball players
Olympic silver medalists for the Soviet Union
Volleyball players at the 1988 Summer Olympics
Olympic volleyball players of the Soviet Union
Soviet men's volleyball players
Belarusian volleyball coaches
Olympic medalists in volleyball
Russian men's volleyball players
Sportspeople from Grodno
Coaches of Russia men's national volleyball team
Medalists at the 1988 Summer Olympics